Bertrand Edouard Doger de Speville (16 June 1941 – 29 March 2020) was a Hong Kong government official who served as solicitor general and as the commissioner of the Independent Commission Against Corruption (ICAC).

Biography
Born in Durban, South Africa, de Speville was raised in Salisbury (now called Harare), Southern Rhodesia. He moved to England in 1960 to study law at University College London, and was called to the bar in 1964. He spent 10 years as a barrister in private practice followed by three years in the United Kingdom legal service. At the urging of then-Attorney General John Calvert Griffiths, de Speville moved to Hong Kong and joined the civil service in January 1981 as a deputy principal crown counsel. In October 1985 he was promoted to principal crown counsel.

On 10 July 1992, de Speville formally took up the post of solicitor general, succeeding Frank Stock. He had actually served in this role on an acting basis since 1991. He subsequently served as commissioner of the Independent Commission Against Corruption from 22 February 1993 until 21 January 1996.

After stepping down, de Speville returned to England and established de Speville and Associates, an anti-corruption consultancy, and advised various countries and agencies on strategies for combatting corruption. He was elected as a bencher in 2007. He died at home in Kew on 29 March 2020.

Books

References

1941 births
2020 deaths
Alumni of University College London
Government officials of Hong Kong
Hong Kong legal professionals
People from Harare
Solicitors General of Hong Kong